Vanilla, the vanilla orchids, forms a flowering plant genus of about 110 species in the orchid family (Orchidaceae). The most widely known member is the flat-leaved vanilla (V. planifolia),  native to Mexico and Belize, from which commercial vanilla flavoring is derived. It is the only orchid widely used for industrial purposes in flavoring such products as foods, beverages and cosmetics, and is recognized as the most popular aroma and flavor. The key constituent imparting its flavour is the phenolic aldehyde, vanillin.

This evergreen genus occurs worldwide in tropical and subtropical regions, from tropical America to tropical Asia, New Guinea and West Africa. Five species are known from the contiguous United States, all limited to southern Florida.

The genus was established in 1754 by Plumier, based on J. Miller. The word vanilla, derived from the diminutive of the Spanish word vaina (vaina itself meaning sheath or pod), simply translates as little pod.

Description 

This genus of vine-like plants has a monopodial climbing habitus. They can form long thin stems with a length of more than 35 m, with alternate leaves spread along their length. The short, oblong, dark green leaves of Vanilla are thick and leathery, even fleshy in some species. But there are also a significant number of species that have their leaves reduced to scales or have become nearly or totally leafless and appear to use their green climbing stems for photosynthesis. Long and strong aerial roots grow from each node.

The racemose inflorescence's short-lived flowers arise successively on short peduncles from the leaf axils or scales. There may be up to 100 flowers on a single raceme, but usually no less than 20. The flowers are quite large and attractive with white, green, greenish yellow or cream colors. The flowers' sepals and petals are similar. The lip is tubular-shaped and surrounds the long, bristly column, opening up, as the bell of a trumpet, at its apex. The anther is at the top of the column and hangs over the stigma, separated by the rostellum. Most Vanilla flowers have a sweet scent.

Blooming occurs only when the flowers are fully grown.  Each flower opens up in the morning and closes late in the afternoon on the same day, never to reopen. If pollination has not occurred meanwhile, it will be shed. The flowers are self-fertile, but need pollinators to perform this task. In the Neotropics, the flowers were historically presumed to be pollinated by stingless bees (e.g. Melipona) or hummingbirds, but this was never confirmed; the only actual documented pollination (i.e., producing seed set) is recorded for an orchid bee, Eulaema meriana, visiting Vanilla grandiflora in Peru, and pollinia of Vanilla species have been observed attached to other species of Eulaema in Panama. Hand pollination is the most reliable method in commercially grown vanilla. Vanilla plantations require trees for the orchids to climb and anchor by its roots.

The fruit is termed "vanilla bean", though true beans are fabaceous eudicots not at all closely related to orchids. Rather, the vanilla fruit is technically an elongate, fleshy and later dehiscent capsule 10–20 cm long. It ripens gradually for 8 to 9 months after flowering, eventually turning black in color and giving off a strong aroma. Each pod contains thousands of minute seeds, and both the pods and seeds within are used to create vanilla flavoring. Vanilla beans are harvested by hand from commercial orchards.

Vanilla species are used as food plants by the larvae of some Lepidoptera species, such as the woolly bear moths Hypercompe eridanus and H. icasia.  Off-season or when abandoned, they may serve as habitat for animals of open forest, e.g. on the Comoros for Robert Mertens's day gecko (Phelsuma robertmertensi).

Selected species 
 See List of Vanilla species

The taxonomy of the genus Vanilla is complex.

This is a partial list of species or synonyms:

 Vanilla albida
 Vanilla andamanica
 Vanilla andina
 Vanilla aphylla Blume – Leafless vanilla
 Vanilla atropogon
 Vanilla bahiana
 Vanilla barbellata – Small bearded vanilla, wormvine orchid, "leafless vanilla"
 Vanilla chamissonis Klotzsch – Chamisso's vanilla
 Vanilla claviculata – Green withe
 Vanilla dilloniana – Dillon's vanilla, "leafless vanilla"
 Vanilla edwallii – Edwall's vanilla
 Vanilla humblotii
 Vanilla mexicana Mill. – Mexican vanilla
 Vanilla moonii
 Vanilla odorata C.Presl
 Vanilla phaeantha – Leafy vanilla
 Vanilla pilifera Holttum
 Vanilla planifolia Andrews – Flat-leaved vanilla, Tahitian vanilla, "West Indian vanilla"
 Vanilla poitaei – Poiteau's vanilla
 Vanilla polylepis
 Vanilla pompona Schiede – Pompona vanilla, Guadeloupe vanilla, "West Indian vanilla"
 Vanilla raabii
 Vanilla roscheri
 Vanilla shenzhenica
 Vanilla siamensis – Thai vanilla
 Vanilla somae
 Vanilla tahitensis
 Vanilla walkeriae

Aroma and flavor
 
Regarded as the world's most popular aroma and flavor, vanilla contains the phenolic aldehyde, vanillin, as well as anisaldehyde, together accounting for its predominant sensory characteristics. Vanilla is a widely used aroma and flavor compound for foods, beverages and cosmetics, as indicated by its popularity as an ice cream flavor.

References

External links 
	

 World Checklist of Vanilla at Kew

 
Vanilleae
Vanilloideae genera
Vines
Extant Albian first appearances
Early Cretaceous life of Africa
Early Cretaceous life of Asia
Early Cretaceous life of North America
Early Cretaceous life of South America